Mahmoud Saad (Arabic:محمود سعد) (born 12 January 1983) is a Qatari born-Egyptian footballer. He currently plays for Al-Kharaitiyat .

External links

References

Egyptian footballers
Qatari footballers
1983 births
Living people
Haras El Hodoud SC players
El Jaish SC players
Al Kharaitiyat SC players
Egyptian Premier League players
Qatar Stars League players
Qatari Second Division players
Qatari people of Egyptian descent
Association football wingers
Egyptian expatriate footballers
Egyptian expatriate sportspeople in Qatar
Expatriate footballers in Qatar
Egyptian emigrants to Qatar
Naturalised citizens of Qatar